José Carlos Godoy Riofrio (born 19 December 1911 in Lima, Peru; died 13 February 1988 in Lima, Peru) was a Peruvian basketball player who competed in the 1936 Summer Olympics. He was part of the Peruvian basketball team, which finished eighth in the Olympic tournament. He played one match. His brother, Miguel, also competed in the same event.

References

External links
 

1911 births
1988 deaths
Peruvian men's basketball players
Olympic basketball players of Peru
Basketball players at the 1936 Summer Olympics
Sportspeople from Lima
20th-century Peruvian people